Wolfgang Becker may refer to:

 Wolfgang Becker (director, born 1910) (1910–2005), German film director and film editor
 Wolfgang Becker (director, born 1954), German film director and screenwriter